Ridwan Saidi (2 July 1942 – 25 December 2022) was an Indonesian writer and politician. A member of the United Development Party, he served in the People's Representative Council from 1977 to 1987.

Saidi died in South Tangerang on 25 December 2022, at the age of 80.

References

1942 births
2022 deaths
Indonesian writers
United Development Party politicians
University of Indonesia alumni
Politicians from Jakarta
Members of the People's Representative Council, 1977
Members of the People's Representative Council, 1982